The Orchard may refer to:

 The Orchard (company), American music and entertainment company 
 The Orchard (band), Canadian country music duo
 The Orchard (Lizz Wright album), 2008
 The Orchard (Ra Ra Riot album), 2010
 The Orchard (tea room), a tea room and tea garden in Grantchester, near Cambridge, England
 The James L. Breese House, a historic home in Southampton, New York
 The Orchard, a 2022 play based on Anton Chekhov's 1903 play The Cherry Orchard

See also 
 Orchard (disambiguation)